Chris Cummiskey (born August 15, 1964) is a former member of both the Arizona State Senate and the Arizona House of Representatives. He served in the House from January 1991 until January 1995, and in the Senate from January 1995 through January 2003. He was first elected to the House in November 1990, representing District 25, and was re-elected in 1992.

In 1994 he ran for the State Senate from the district, and won. He was re-elected in 1996, 1998, and 2000.

References

1964 births
Living people
Democratic Party Arizona state senators
Democratic Party members of the Arizona House of Representatives
People from Point Pleasant, New Jersey